Cynthia Brown is a French singer with Indian origins, who participated in the French reality television show Star Academy France (2006) on TF1 including in the semi-final.

Biography 
She lost against Cyril Cinelu who won in the final against Dominique Fidanza. She performed duos with Beyoncé Knowles, Julio Iglesias, Patrick Bruel, Johnny Hallyday, etc. In 2008, she began to record an album under Youssou N'Dour's direction, but Universal Music Group put the plan to one side. The Senegalese singer Youssou N'Dour offered her one of his compositions : Bébé, a song dedicated to all children in the world. In 2010, she finalised her album Hétéroclite, with the single Notre Terre.

Discography 
2010 : Album : "Hétéroclite" / Single : Notre terre.

References

External links
  Artist's official website.
 

Living people
French women singers
Star Academy participants
French people of Indian descent
Place of birth missing (living people)
Year of birth missing (living people)